Syrnola floridana is a species of sea snail, a marine gastropod mollusk in the family Pyramidellidae, the pyrams and their allies.

Description
The length of the shell measures 3.5 mm.

Distribution
The type specimen  was found in the Atlantic Ocean off Georgia, USA at a depth of  538 m.

References

External links
 To Biodiversity Heritage Library (1 publication)
 To Encyclopedia of Life
 To World Register of Marine Species

Pyramidellidae
Gastropods described in 1927